C. nigrum may refer to:
 Centroscyllium nigrum, the combtooth dogfish, a little-known deepwater dogfish shark species
 Colletotrichum nigrum, a plant pathogen species
 Coluber nigrum, a synonym for Causus rhombeatus, a venomous viper species found in subsaharan Africa

See also
 List of Latin and Greek words commonly used in systematic names#N